Toeolesulusulu Cedric Schuster is a Samoan environmentalist, politician and Cabinet Minister. He is a member of the FAST Party.

Schuster is from the village of Satapuala. He was educated at the University of Victoria and at Brandeis University in the United States. He has previously worked for the World Wide Fund for Nature, the Samoan government's Division of Environment and Conservation, Seacology, and as an environmental consultant. Schuster is the cousin of Lefau Harry Schuster and the father of swimmer Brandon Schuster.

Political career

Schuster was elected to the Legislative Assembly of Samoa at the 2011 Samoan general election, as a candidate for the Tautua Samoa Party. In August 2012 he took part in a roadblock in his village of Satapuala which sough to block access to land the village was claiming. He was subsequently charged with unlawful assembly and obstruction. in August 2013 he was convicted of unlawful assembly, resisting police, obstruction and using foul language and fined US$635. He subsequently apologised to Parliament for the incident.

In April 2014, Schuster became the first Samoan MP to join International Parliamentarians for West Papua.

He lost his seat at the 2016 election.

In October 2020 Schuster announced he would stand as a candidate for the F.A.S.T. Party in the April 2021 election. He was elected. On 24 May 2021 he was appointed Minister of Natural Resources and Environment in the elected cabinet of Fiamē Naomi Mataʻafa. The appointment was disputed by the caretaker government. On 23 July 2021 the Court of Appeal ruled that the swearing-in ceremony was constitutional and binding, and that FAST had been the government since 24 May.

On 1 June 2021, while returning from FAST's first-anniversary celebration, Schuster was arrested for drunk-driving. On 3 June he resigned his portfolio, which was later reassigned to prime minister Fiamē Naomi Mata‘afa. On 20 July he pleaded guilty to three traffic offences and applied for a discharge without conviction. On 15 October 2021 he was fined $2,000 and discharged without conviction. He returned to Cabinet on 20 October 2021 as Minister for Natural Resources and Environment and Tourism.

References

|-

|-

|-

|-

|-

Living people
Members of the Legislative Assembly of Samoa
Environment ministers of Samoa
Tourism ministers of Samoa
Samoan chiefs
Tautua Samoa Party politicians
Faʻatuatua i le Atua Samoa ua Tasi politicians
Year of birth missing (living people)
Brandeis University alumni
Samoan environmentalists